Belgium's high-speed rail network provides mostly international connections from Brussels to France, Germany and The Netherlands. The high-speed network began with the opening of the HSL 1 to France in 1997, and since then high-speed lines have been extended towards Germany with HSL 2 in 2002, HSL 3 from Liège to the German border in 2009, and HSL 4 from Antwerp to the Dutch border in 2009.

Services 
Four high-speed train services currently operate in Belgium: Thalys, Eurostar, InterCityExpress (ICE) and TGV. All operators stop in Brussels-South railway station, Belgium's largest train station. Some services also stop in Liège and Antwerp. However, it's not possible to book a ticket on a domestic route between Brussels and one of these cities by Thalys. Frequent Belgian IC trains (that run every 15-30min) will do so instead and use the same high-speed lines. Eurostar connects Brussels to London St Pancras. The German ICE operates between Brussels-South, Liège-Guillemins railway station and Frankfurt (Main) Hauptbahnhof via Köln (Cologne). Thalys connects Brussels with Paris (in 1h22), Rotterdam, Amsterdam, Cologne and Düsseldorf.

Lines

HSL 1 

HSL 1 connects Brussels with the French border.  long ( dedicated high-speed tracks,  modernised lines), it began service on 14 December 1997. The line has appreciably shortened rail journeys, the journey from Paris to Brussels now taking 1:22. In combination with the LGV Nord, it has also impacted international journeys to France and London, ensuring high-speed through-running by Eurostar, TGV, Thalys PBA and Thalys PBKA trainsets. The total construction cost was €1.42 billion.

HSL 2 

HSL 2 runs between Leuven and Ans.  long ( dedicated high-speed tracks,  modernised lines) it began service on 15 December 2002. Combined with HSL 3 to the German border, the combined eastward high speed lines have greatly accelerated journeys between Brussels, Paris and Germany. HSL 2 is used by Thalys and ICE trains as well as fast internal InterCity services.

HSL 3 

HSL 3 connects Liège to the German border.  long ( dedicated high-speed tracks,  modernised lines), it was completed on 15 December 2007, but trains did not start to use it until June 14, 2009. HSL 3 is used by international Thalys and ICE trains only, as opposed to HSL 2 which is also used for fast internal InterCity services.

HSL 4 

HSL 4 connects Antwerp north to the Dutch border where it meets the HSL-Zuid. Mostly completed in 2007, the opening of the line was delayed till December 2009 due to problems with signalling. HSL 4 is used by Thalys trains and fast internal InterCity. Initially, NS Hispeed (now NS International) planned using the newly ordered V250 for the fast Fyra train service between Brussels, Antwerp, Rotterdam and Amsterdam. Due to technical problems with the model, this plan was scrapped. The NS has ordered 20 new ICNG trains for service on this route.

25N 
, which is part of the Diabolo project, is being built between Schaerbeek and Mechelen and is being constructed for a maximum speed of 220 km/h. There is also a project under way to renovate Mechelen railway station, which involves the construction of tracks at the edge of the station set aside for passing high-speed traffic. When this line is completed, there will be a near-continuous stretch of high-speed line from Brussels to Amsterdam, save for the section between Mechelen and Antwerp.  It is not known whether the Belgian government plans to construct a line between Mechelen and Antwerp.  There are also areas where the trains cannot run at high speed near the stations: for trains leaving Brussels, 220 km/h will not be possible until the trains reach Schaerbeek and HSL-4 does not begin until a few kilometres after Antwerp.  The track around Rotterdam station has curvatures that are too tight to allow trains to run at full speed and trains run on conventional track between Schiphol and Amsterdam.

EuroCap-Rail 

EuroCap-Rail is a proposed high-speed rail axis connecting Brussels, Luxembourg (city), and Strasbourg—three cities which, combined, are the homes of six of the seven institutions of the European Union and unofficially called the capitals of Europe. The axis would run along existing lines that would be upgraded for high-speed rail service.

Stations

There are 4 stations in Belgium where high-speed trains stop:

 Antwerpen-Centraal
 Bruxelles-Midi / Brussel-Zuid
 Bruxelles-Nord / Brussel-Noord
 Liège-Guillemins

See also 

 Rail transport in Belgium

Notes